Fast Forward is the fourteenth album by the American jazz group Spyro Gyra, released in 1990 by GRP Records. On this album only, the band was billed on the album cover as "Spyro Gyra featuring Jay Beckenstein". At Billboard magazine, the album peaked at No. 117 on the Top 200 Albums chart.

Track listing 
 "Bright Lights" (Dave Samuels) – 5:20
 "Para Ti Latino" (Oskar Cartaya) – 4:15
 "Alexandra" (Jay Beckenstein) – 4:43
 "Ocean Parkway" (Jeremy Wall) – 4:30
 "Speak Easy" (Jeff Beal) – 5:03
 "Futurephobia" (Tom Schuman) – 4:22
 "4MD" (Wall) – 4:36
 "Shadow Play" (Beckenstein) – 5:05
 "Escape Hatch" (Schuman) – 5:12
 "Tower of Babel" (Beckenstein) – 5:29

Personnel 

Spyro Gyra
 Jay Beckenstein – saxophones
 Tom Schuman – keyboards
 Jay Azzolina – guitars
 Oskar Cartaya – bass
 Richie Morales – drums
 Dave Samuels – vibraphone, marimba, mallet synthesizer 
 Marc Quiñones – percussion

Additional Personnel
 Jeff Beal – trumpet solos, arrangements (5)
 David Broza – vocals (10)

No Sweat Horns
 Scott Kreitzer – tenor saxophone
 Randy Andos – trombone, bass trombone 
 Barry Danielian – trumpet, flugelhorn, horn arrangements

Production 
 Jay Beckenstein – producer
 Jeremy Wall – assistant producer
 Larry Swist – recording, engineer, mixing 
 Chris Bubacz – additional recording
 Doug Rose – assistant engineer
 Ted Jensen – mastering at Sterling Sound (New York, NY).
 Andy Baltimore – creative director
 Jeff Adamoff – art direction 
 David Gibb – graphic design 
 Jacki McCarthy – graphic design
 Andy Ruggirello – graphic design
 Dan Serrano – graphic design
 Ted Glazer – illustration 
 Paul D'Innocenzo – photography

References

External links
 Spyro Gyra official web site

1990 albums
Spyro Gyra albums
GRP Records albums